Machaca is an album by American composer-arranger/keyboadist Clare Fischer, the second to feature his Latin jazz combo, Salsa Picante. Recorded on May 16 and 17, 1979, it was released in 1980 on the German label, MPS, and in the U.S. the following year on the Discovery label.

Reception
Los Angeles Times jazz critic Leonard Feather awarded the album 3 and a half stars, citing the blend of "light rock, Brazilian and miscellaneous Latin," and further noting that:
The leader's organ and other keyboard work and Rick Zunigar's guitar have some striking moments, and a team of percussionists stir up a storm, though the rhythmic excesses become tiresome on the title number. "Novios" is charming, with a suave beat and Gary Foster on flute. "African Flutes" makes intriguing use of two bass recorders, played by Fischer and Foster.

Track listing
All selections composed by Clare Fischer except where noted.

Side One
 "African Flutes'' – 8:08
 "Gaviota" – 6:14
 "Suddenly" – 5:18
 "Clavo" – 3:13
Side Two
 "Machaca" - 9:39
 "Cositas" (David Troncoso) – 3:25
 "Novios" – 2:40
 "Gentle Breeze" – 6:45

Personnel
Clare Fischer – e-piano, Yamaha EX-42 organ
Rick Zunigar – guitar
David Troncoso – el. bass
Gary Foster – flute, soprano sax, bass recorder
Aaron Ballesteros – drums 
Alex Acuña – tambora, drums, timbales, percussion, bongos
Poncho Sanchez – conga, bongos, campana
Hector "Buckey" Andrade – percussion, campana (bell), quinto, bongos, timbales

Notes

References 

1981 albums
Albums arranged by Clare Fischer
Clare Fischer albums
Latin jazz albums by American artists
MPS Records albums
Discovery Records albums

Albums recorded at Capitol Studios